Wartberg (Stuttgart) is a low eminence in the city of Stuttgart in the German state of Baden-Württemberg.

Mountains and hills of Baden-Württemberg